In basketball, a rebound is the act of gaining possession of the ball after a missed field goal or free throw.  The Basketball League Belgium Division I's rebounding title is awarded to the player with the highest rebounds per game average in a given regular season.

Leaders

References

External links
Ethias League seasons at Eurobasket.com

rebounds